Lisa Mays (born 10 October 2000) is an Australian tennis player.

Mays has a career-high singles ranking by the Women's Tennis Association (WTA) of 846, achieved on 31 December 2018.. She has won two doubles titles on the ITF Women's Circuit.

Mays made her WTA Tour main-draw debut at the 2022 Sydney International, where she partnered Michaela Haet in the doubles draw.

ITF Circuit finals

Doubles: 6 (3 titles, 3 runner–ups)

References

External links
 
 
 Lisa Mays at Texas Tech University

2000 births
Living people
Australian female tennis players
Tennis players from Sydney
Texas Tech Red Raiders women's tennis players